The 2013–14 EOJHL season is the 47th season of the Eastern Ontario Junior Hockey League (EOJHL). The twenty two teams of the EOJHL will play between 40 and 45-game schedules.

Come February, the top teams of the league will play down for the D. Arnold Carson Memorial Trophy, the EOJHL championship.

Current standings 
Note: GP = Games played; W = Wins; L = Losses; OTL = Overtime losses; SL = Shootout losses; GF = Goals for; GA = Goals against; PTS = Points; x = clinched playoff berth; y = clinched division title.

Teams listed on the official league website.

2014 D. Arnold Carson Memorial Trophy Playoffs

League Playdowns

Don Johnson Memorial Cup
Winner of the EOJHL went on to Port Hawkesbury, Nova Scotia to play in the Eastern Canada Junior B Championship
Played in Port Hawkesbury, Nova Scotia, hosted by the Strait Pirates.

On April 22, 2014, the Casselman Vikings of the Eastern Ontario Junior Hockey League played in Port Hawkesbury, Nova Scotia and became the first non-Atlantic Canada team to compete at the event.  The Vikings would defeat the Fredericton Jr. Caps 6-1 in their debut.  The 2014 tournament would also mark the tournament being rebranded from the Atlantic Junior B Championships to the Eastern Canadian Junior B Championships.  The Vikings would sweep the event with six wins and no losses.  The rebranding did not last long.  The 2015 championship was slated to take place in Arnprior, Ontario, the first to take place outside of Atlantic Canada, but since it has been re-awarded to Tyne Valley, Prince Edward Island.

Round Robin

Championship round

Trophies and awards
D. Arnold Carson Memorial Trophy Awarded to the EOJHL Playoff Champions:
John Shorey Cup Awarded to Rideau/St. Lawrence Conference Playoff Champions:
Dwaine Barkley Trophy Awarded to Metro/Valley Conference Playoff Champions:
Gill Trophy Awarded to Rideau Division Playoff Champions:
Alex English Trophy Awarded to St. Lawrence Division Playoff Champions:
Ottawa Nepean Sportsplex Trophy Awarded to Metro Division Playoff Champions:
Carl Foley Trophy Awarded to Valley Division Playoff Champions:

References

External links
Eastern Ontario Junior Hockey League Website

B
Ice hockey in Ottawa
B
Sports leagues established in 1966
1966 establishments in Ontario